Giuliana Berlinguer (23 November 1933 – 15 September 2014) was an Italian director, screenwriter, and novelist.

Life and career 
Born in Mantua, Berlinguer studied at the Silvio d’Amico Academy of Dramatic Arts, where she graduated in stage direction. She later focused on television, directing several RAI TV-movies and series, notably a successful 1969 Nero Wolfe miniseries starring Tino Buazzelli in the title role.

In 1983 she directed the war-drama film Il disertore, which was screened at the Venice Film Festival. She was the wife of Giovanni Berlinguer,
the brother of Enrico Berlinguer.

References

External links 
 

1933 births
2014 deaths
20th-century Italian writers
Italian film directors
Italian women film directors
Italian screenwriters
Italian women screenwriters
Writers from Mantua
Accademia Nazionale di Arte Drammatica Silvio D'Amico alumni
20th-century Italian women